The 2009–10 New Zealand Figure Skating Championships was held at the Paradice Ice Arena in Botany Downs, Auckland from 11 through 16 October 2009. Skaters competed in the disciplines of men's singles, ladies' singles, ice dancing, and synchronized skating across many levels, including senior, junior, novice, adult, and the pre-novice disciplines of juvenile, pre-primary, primary, and intermediate.

Skaters from Australia competed as guest skaters and their results were discounted from the final results.

Senior results

Men

Ladies

Synchronized

Junior results

Men

Ladies

Ice dancing

Synchronized

Novice results

Girls

Synchronized

External links
 2009–10 New Zealand Figure Skating Championships results* 2009 New Zealand National Championships
 

2009 in figure skating
New Zealand Figure Skating Championships
Figure Skating
October 2009 sports events in New Zealand